Ceanothus depressus Benth. is a shrub in the family Rhamnaceae, native to the Mexican states of Chihuahua and Sonora. It is a shrub up to 70 cm tall, growing in clearings in pine-oak forests.

Uses

The Pima Bajo in the vicinity of Yepachic (Chihuahua) and Maycoba (Sonora) refer to the species as "junco," a name more commonly used for Juncus spp. in most of Mexico. They use the aromatic red roots to make a flavorful tea.

References

depressus
Flora of Mexico
Flora of Chihuahua (state)
Flora of Sonora